Team North America was a hockey team created for the 2016 World Cup of Hockey. It represented players aged 23-and-under from Canada and the United States.

A "Team North America" was also assembled for the National Hockey League All-Star Game from 1998 to 2002, and consisted of NHL players of any age from Canada and the United States.

2016 World Cup of Hockey
Team North America played its first pre-tournament game on September 8, 2016. They defeated Team Europe 4–0 at the Videotron Centre, in Quebec City. They then played 2 more pre-tournament games, defeating Team Europe 7–4, and conceding to Czech Republic 3–2.

The team played only 3 official tournament games; a 4–1 win over Finland, a 4–3 loss against Russia, and a 4–3 overtime win against Sweden. Despite finishing in a tie with Russia for the final spot in the knockout round, Team North America did not advance as their head-to-head loss to Russia broke the tie. 

Team North America finished the tournament in 5th place with a record of 2–1–0. They scored 11 goals and allowed 8 for a +3 differential.

All-time record against other nations

Roster
Head coach: Todd McLellan

Sean Monahan was originally selected but could not participate due to injury. He was replaced by Vincent Trocheck.

See also
 Team North America
 Team Europe

References

North America, TEAM, World Cup of Hockey 2016
North America, World Cup of Hockey 2016
North America, TEAM